The AMD Athlon II family is a 64-bit microprocessor family from Advanced Micro Devices (AMD), based on the K10 microarchitecture. As with the Phenom II, it's an improved second generation of said microarchitecture.

Desktop processors

"Zosma" (E0, 45 nm, Quad-core) 

 Chip harvests from Thuban with two cores and L3 cache disabled
 All models support: MMX, SSE, SSE2, SSE3, SSE4a, ABM, Enhanced 3DNow!, NX bit, AMD64, Cool'n'Quiet, AMD-V, Turbo Core (AMD equivalent of Intel Turbo Boost)
 Memory support: DDR2 up to PC2-8500, DDR3 up to PC3-10600 (Socket AM3 only)

"Propus" (C2/C3, 45 nm, Quad-core) 

 Chip harvests from Deneb with L3 cache disabled
 All models support: MMX, SSE, SSE2, SSE3, SSE4a, ABM, Enhanced 3DNow!, NX bit, AMD64, Cool'n'Quiet, AMD-V
 Memory support: DDR2 up to PC2-8500 (DDR2-1066 MHz), DDR3 up to PC3-10600 (DDR3-1333 MHz) (Socket AM3 only)

"Rana" (C2/C3, 45 nm, Tri-core) 

 Chip harvests from Propus and Deneb with one core disabled
 All models support: MMX, SSE, SSE2, SSE3, SSE4a, ABM, Enhanced 3DNow!, NX bit, AMD64, Cool'n'Quiet, AMD-V
 Memory support: DDR2 up to PC2-8500 (DDR2-1066 MHz), DDR3 up to PC3-10600 (DDR3-1333 MHz) (Socket AM3 only)

"Regor" (C2/C3, 45 nm, Dual-core) 

 Some are chip harvests from Propus or Deneb with two cores disabled
 Most Regor-based processors feature double the L2 cache per core (1 MB) as other Athlon II and Phenom II processors.
 Some units of the 210E, 215 and 220 are able to unlock 2 disabled cores sometimes with L3 cache if the motherboard BIOS enables that unlocking.
 All models support: MMX, SSE, SSE2, SSE3, SSE4a, ABM, Enhanced 3DNow!, NX bit, AMD64, Cool'n'Quiet, AMD-V
 Memory support: DDR2 up to PC2-8500, DDR3 up to PC3-8500 (DDR3-1066 MHz) (Socket AM3 only)

"Sargas" (C2/C3, 45 nm, Single-core) 

 Chip harvests from Regor with one core disabled
 All models support: MMX, SSE, SSE2, SSE3, SSE4a, ABM, Enhanced 3DNow!, NX bit, AMD64, Cool'n'Quiet, AMD-V
 Memory support: DDR2 up to PC2-6400, DDR3 up to PC3-8500 (Socket AM3 only)

"Llano" (B0, 32nm) 
 Platform "Lynx"
 Socket FM1
 CPU: K10 (or Husky or K10.5) with no L3 cache cores with an upgraded architecture known as Stars
 L1 Cache: 64 KB Data per core and 64 KB Instructions per core
 MMX, Enhanced 3DNow!, SSE, SSE2, SSE3, SSE4a, ABM, NX bit, AMD64, Cool'n'Quiet, AMD-V
 Support for up to four DIMMs of up to DDR3-1866 memory
 Fabrication 32 nm on GlobalFoundries SOI process; Die size: , with 1.178 billion transistors
 5 GT/s UMI
 Integrated PCIe 2.0 controller

Mobile processors

Athlon II mobile processors (Phenom-based)

"Caspian" (45 nm, Dual-core) 

 Based on the AMD K10 microarchitecture
 Only 64 bit FPU
 All models support: MMX, SSE, SSE2, SSE3, SSE4a, ABM, Enhanced 3DNow!, NX bit, AMD64, PowerNow!, AMD-V

Athlon II mobile processors (Phenom II-based)

"Champlain" (45 nm, Dual-core) 

 Based on the AMD K10 microarchitecture
 Only 64 bit FPU
 All models support: MMX, SSE, SSE2, SSE3, SSE4a, ABM, Enhanced 3DNow!, NX bit, AMD64, Cool'n'Quiet, AMD-V
 Memory support: DDR3, DDR3L

Athlon II Neo mobile processors (Phenom II-based) 

 Based on the AMD K10 microarchitecture
 Only 64 bit FPU
 All models support: MMX, SSE, SSE2, SSE3, SSE4a, ABM, Enhanced 3DNow!, NX bit, AMD64, Cool'n'Quiet, AMD-V
 Memory support: DDR3, DDR3L

"Geneva" (45 nm, Dual-core)

"Geneva" (45 nm, Single-core)

Notes

References

AMD